WMGK (102.9 FM, "102-9 MGK") is a commercial FM radio station licensed to serve Philadelphia, Pennsylvania. The station is owned by Beasley Broadcast Group and broadcasts a classic rock radio format. The station features popular Philadelphia radio personalities John DeBella and Andre Gardner.

History

1940-1966: Early years
On November 26, 1940, the Federal Communications Commission granted WCAU Broadcasting Company a construction permit for a new FM station on 46.7 MHz on the original 42–50 MHz FM broadcast band with the W67PH call sign. The construction permit was modified on January 28, 1941, when the FCC reallocated the station to 46.9 MHz with a corresponding call sign change to W69PH. On November 24, 1941, the FCC granted the station authority to begin broadcasting and granted its first license on November 18, 1942.

On November 1, 1943, the station was assigned the WCAU-FM call sign. After the FCC created the current FM broadcast band on June 27, 1945, the commission granted WCAU Broadcasting the authority to begin operating the station on 102.7 MHz on December 17, 1945.

The FCC granted a voluntarily reassignment of the station's license to Philadelphia Record Company on October 17, 1946. On June 27, 1947, the FCC reallocated the station to 102.9 MHz, followed by another voluntary reassignment of the station's license on November 28, 1947, to William Penn Broadcasting Company. This reassignment was effective on December 18, 1947, at which time the station's call sign was changed to WPEN-FM. The new owners filed an application for a construction permit to move the station to 102.9 MHz on July 12, 1948. A new license for operation on the new frequency was granted by the FCC on August 17, 1950.

WPEN-FM was one of the first two FM stations to be licensed for SCA (subcarrier) service. The station filed an application for the SCA on October 12, 1955, with the FCC granting the authorization on July 1, 1956. Subcarriers could be used to send special programming to subscribers, such as background music for stores and restaurants.

From its earliest days until the 1960s, WPEN-FM mostly simulcast 950 WPEN.

1966-1974: MOR
In 1966, when the Federal Communications Commission no longer allowed most FM stations to simulcast their AM counterparts full-time, WPEN-FM carried a middle-of-the-road format, similar to the AM station, but with fewer interruptions and with mostly pre-recorded DJ comments. Some hours were still simulcast.

1974-198?: Soft rock
On October 16, 1974, the station's license was voluntarily transferred by the FCC to Greater Philadelphia Radio, Inc. (a subsidiary of Greater Media), with an effective date of January 6, 1975. On September 2, 1975, the station's call sign was changed to WMGK. The station adopted a soft rock format and changed its slogan to "Magic Music" with the Magic 103 branding. The first song aired under the new call sign was "Could It Be Magic" by Barry Manilow. The music on Magic 103 was mostly album cuts from singer-songwriters of the 1960s and early 1970s, presented in four-song blocks with minimal talk. The station would not play artists primarily found on the Top 40, such as The Carpenters or Anne Murray. The playlist was made up of softer songs heard on album rock stations, from artists such as Elton John, Carole King, Billy Joel and Carly Simon. The format was quite successful, with Greater Media putting "Magic Music" on its other FM stations, along with call letters referring to "Magic," WMJC in Detroit, WMJX in Boston and WMGQ in New Brunswick, New Jersey.

On December 22, 1976, the FCC granted Greater Philadelphia Radio, Inc. a construction permit to relocate the station's transmitter and antenna to the Roxborough section of Philadelphia. The station's license was renewed by the FCC with the new facilities on July 12, 1978.

Over time, WMGK began to lose listeners to WUSL, known as "US 1". WUSL had switched from easy listening to a soft vocal format similar to WMGK, but with a shorter playlist of more familiar songs. Eventually, WMGK responded with an even tighter playlist, moving from soft rock to a soft adult contemporary format and rebounded past WUSL in the ratings. The station was programmed by the late Dave Klahr and signed on by its first midday host Pete Booker, who later programmed Greater Media sister station WMJC in Detroit, and who recently retired as CEO of the Delmarva Broadcasting Company.

198?-1994: Adult contemporary
In the mid 1980s, Magic 103 leaned soft, but played several uptempo songs an hour, along with more current product. In the spring of 1986, WMGK started a contemporary jazz show called Sunday Morning Jazz, later renamed Sunday Evening Jazz in early 1987. The show was hosted by Bob Craig and ended in October 1988 when Craig left the radio station. Craig returned in the spring of 1990, and again hosted a contemporary jazz show, this one running on both Saturday and Sunday nights from 7 p.m. to midnight. Along with the jazz, some soft rock songs were mixed in as well. The show lasted one year and ended in the early summer of 1991. Eventually Philadelphia got its first full-time smooth jazz station in 1993, 106.1 WJJZ, which made its debut two years after WMGK's contemporary jazz show had ended.

WUSL, the chief rival to WMGK, switched to country music in 1981. In 1989, WEAZ, an easy listening outlet known as "Easy 101," made the transition to Soft AC, and in 1993, changed its call sign to WBEB, calling itself "B-101."  Easy 101 had a large number of listeners, and most of them stayed with the station when it became B-101, causing WMGK to slip in the ratings. In addition, WSNI was also playing adult contemporary music, giving Philadelphia three stations in the AC format.

1994-1997: '70s Hits
On July 11, 1994, WMGK dropped the long time AC format and changed it to an all-1970s format. The 70s hits included classic rock, soft rock, disco and R&B. By 1995, the station added a few big 1960s and 1980s hits, and no longer used the term "Magic." By the Fall of 1995, WMGK played mostly classic rock with some rock-friendly classic hits thrown in, but not much of the harder material.

1997- present: Classic rock
In 1997, Greater Media acquired two more Philadelphia FM stations, album rock WMMR and modern AC WXXM. WMGK continued to position itself as a Classic Hits station. But when WYSP changed its format from classic rock to modern rock, WMGK began to describe itself as classic rock, eliminated non-rock 70s songs altogether. Still, with rocker WMMR in the cluster, playing plenty of harder-edged classics, WMGK leaned softer than most classic rock stations.

On November 17, 2006, at 6 pm, former New Jersey-based classic rock station WTHK became "The New Smooth Jazz 97.5 WJJZ." With WTHK no longer airing classic rock, WMGK became the Philadelphia region's only classic rock station. The station on 97.5 is now co-owned with WMGK and carries a sports radio format as WPEN-FM, which was once WMGK's call sign.

On April Fools' Day in 2015, WMGK reverted to its broadcast to its previous adult contemporary/soft rock music format; he announced WMGK "Magic 103" and played the old Magic jingles. The prank ended when a listener called in to the station to complain about the loss of classic rock.

On July 19, 2016, Beasley Media Group announced it would acquire Greater Media and its 21 stations (including WMGK) for $240 million. The FCC approved the sale on October 6, and the sale closed on November 1.

Competition
WMGK had three major competitors in Philadelphia. On August 25, 2008, WYSP switched from active rock to classic rock, with a harder sound than that of WMGK. On September 2, 2011, WYSP switched to Sports Radio as WIP-FM. WFKB 107.5 Frank FM, licensed to serve Boyertown, Pennsylvania, competed with WMGK in Philadelphia's northern and western suburbs and in the Lehigh Valley. On March 30, 2009, WFKB switched to Christian programming and became WBYN-FM. Currently, listeners in the northern suburbs of Philadelphia can receive WODE-FM 99.9 The Hawk, licensed to serve Easton, Pennsylvania, and primarily focused on the Lehigh Valley.

HD Radio
In early 2006, WMGK launched a digital HD2 subchannel with its "WMGK Deep Trax" format. It features "classic rock nuggets and 'oh wow' songs that may be a bit outside the radio norm." The format has since been switched to oldies.

Signal note
WMGK is short-spaced to two other Class B stations:

WNEW-FM NEW 102.7 (licensed to serve New York City) and WQSR 102.7 Jack FM (licensed to serve Baltimore, Maryland) both operate on 102.7 MHz, a first adjacent channel to WMGK. The distance between WMGK's transmitter and WNEW-FM's transmitter is 82 miles, while the distance between WMGK's transmitter and WQSR's transmitter is 92 miles, as determined by FCC rules. The minimum distance between two Class B stations operating on first adjacent channels according to current FCC rules is 105 miles.

References

External links

MGK
MGK
Classic rock radio stations in the United States